Radomir (Radomir) or Kerkini (Kerkíni), is a mountain on the Bulgarian–Greek border. At  it is the highest peak in the Belasica range. It is also known by its earlier Greek name Kalabáka (Kalabáka).

In Bulgarian, the peak was named after the Bulgarian Emperor Gavril Radomir who took part in the battle of Kleidion in the Belasitsa mountains.

See also
 List of European ultra prominent peaks

References

Mountains of Bulgaria
Mountains of Greece
Landforms of Blagoevgrad Province
Bulgaria–Greece border
International mountains of Europe
Landforms of Serres (regional unit)
Mountains of Central Macedonia
Two-thousanders of Bulgaria
Two-thousanders of Greece